Kütahya Porselen is a Turkish porcelain and ceramics manufacturer in the city of Kütahya.

History

The company was founded in 1970 though pottery has long been made in the region. As well as making pottery for sale to the retail and hotel trade in Turkey and abroad, Kütahya Porselen also operates 43 shops in Turkey and manufactures and installs factory equipment for other ceramic producers. A 25% shareholding was floated on the Istanbul Stock Exchange in 1984.

See also
NG Grup

References

External links
 

online shop in BG. https://pochehli.com

Manufacturing companies based in Kütahya
Turkish brands
Turkish companies established in 1969
Manufacturing companies established in 1969
Porcelain
Ceramics manufacturers of Turkey